Maria Magdalene Tatar (born May 13, 1945) is an American academic whose expertise lies in children's literature, German literature, and folklore. She is the John L. Loeb Professor of Germanic Languages and Literatures, and Chair of the Committee on Degrees in Folklore and Mythology at Harvard University.

Biography 
Maria Tatar was born in Pressath, Germany. Her family emigrated from Hungary to the United States in the 1950s when she was a child.

She grew up in Highland Park, Illinois and graduated from Highland Park High School in 1963.

Tatar earned an undergraduate degree from Denison University and a doctoral degree from Princeton University. In 1971, after finishing her doctorate at Princeton University, Tatar joined the faculty of Harvard University. She received tenure in 1978. She lives in Cambridge, Massachusetts.

Selected works
  Spellbound: Studies on Mesmerism and Literature (Princeton University Press,  1978) 
  The Hard Facts of the Grimms' Fairy Tales (Princeton, 1987) 
  Off With Their Heads! Fairy Tales and the Culture of Childhood (Princeton, 1993) 
  The Annotated Classic Fairy Tales (W. W. Norton & Company, 2002) 
  The Annotated Brothers Grimm  (W.W. Norton, 2004) 
  The Annotated Hans Christian Andersen (W.W. Norton, 2008) 
  Enchanted Hunters: The Power of Stories in Childhood (W.W. Norton, April 2009) 
  "From Bookworms to Enchanted Hunters: Why Children Read" (Journal of Aesthetic Education, Summer 2009, vol.43, no.2, p. 19-36) ISSN 0021-8510
  The Annotated Peter Pan, ed., (W.W. Norton, 2011) 
  The Annotated African American Folktales, ed. with Henry Louis Gates Jr., (Liveright-W.W. Norton, 2017), 
  The Fairest of Them All: Snow White and 21 Tales of Mothers and Daughters, (Harvard University Press,  2020) 
  The Heroine with 1001 Faces (Liveright, 2021),

References

External links
 Maria Tatar at Harvard University
 Breezes from Wonderland – Tatar's blog on storytelling, folklore, and children's literature
 , 2008)
 "Tatar Discusses Development of Fairy Tales", The Harvard Crimson (April 8, 2012)
 

Living people
Denison University alumni
Princeton University alumni
Harvard University faculty
1945 births
People from Highland Park, Illinois